= Baylortown, Virginia =

Unincorporated community in Virginia, United States

Coordinates: 38°05′59″N 77°19′27″W

Baylortown is an unincorporated community in Caroline County, in the U.S. state of Virginia.
